Zajmi is an Albanian surname. Notable people with the surname include:

Agim Zajmi (1936–2013), Albanian painter
Nexhmedin Zajmi (1916–1991), Albanian painter and sculptor
Roland Zajmi (born 1973), Albanian football player

See also
Sipahi

Albanian-language surnames